Ringback may refer to:

 Ringback, the ringing signal in telephony used to recall an operator or customer
 Ringing tone, also ringback tone, the audible ringing that is heard by the calling party after dialing
 Ringback number, a number used by phone companies to test whether a telephone line and phone number is working
 Automatic ring back, a telephone feature to notify the caller when the called party ceases to be engaged